Dharampal Singh is from Sonipat, Haryana. He is serving life imprisonment for killing five family members of a woman in 1993 who got him into jail for rape in 1991 in which he was later acquitted. In 2014, Dharampal's death sentenced was commuted to life imprisonment.

History
He was charged with raping a girl in Sonipat in 1991 and was given a 10-year jail sentence in 1993. After his release on parole in 1993, he and his brother Nirmal bludgeoned to death the girl's parents, a sister and two brothers while they were sleeping at their home. Dharampal and his brother Nirmal were awarded death penalty for the murders in 1997. The sentence was upheld by the High Court a year later. Later in 1999, the Supreme Court commuted the death sentence of Nirmal to life imprisonment retaining Dharampal's death sentence Later in January 2014 high court commuted his death sentence to life imprisonment on the pretext that the government took around thirteen years to decide on his mercy petition.

References

Indian people convicted of murder
Criminals from Haryana
Year of birth missing (living people)
People acquitted of rape
People from Sonipat
Living people
Family murders